Chapicuy is a village in the Paysandú Department of western Uruguay.

Geography
The village is located on the northeastern part of  Paysandú, on the shores of the Arroyo Carpinchuri (Carpinchuri stream) a tributary of Arroyo Chapicuy Grande (Big Chapicuy stream) and on Route 3 at km 454 and relatively near the city of Salto.

History
On June 14, 1818, it was the site of a famous battle where the Uruguayan “Banda Oriental” defeated the Portuguese Army in their fight for independence.

Population
According to the 2011 census, Chapicuy had a population of 735.
 
Source: Instituto Nacional de Estadística de Uruguay

Economy
The main sources of income are cattle, agriculture and forestry.

References

External links
INE map of Chapicuy

Populated places in the Paysandú Department